The Tsunami Warning, Education, and Research Act of 2014 is a bill that would authorize the National Oceanic and Atmospheric Administration (NOAA) to spend $27 million a year for three years on their on-going tsunami warning and research programs.

The bill was introduced into the United States House of Representatives during the 113th United States Congress.

Background

A tsunami, also known as a seismic sea wave, is a series of water waves caused by the displacement of a large volume of a body of water, generally an ocean or a large lake. Earthquakes, volcanic eruptions and other underwater explosions (including detonations of underwater nuclear devices), landslides, glacier calvings, meteorite impacts and other disturbances above or below water all have the potential to generate a tsunami.

Tsunami waves do not resemble normal sea waves, because their wavelength is far longer.  Rather than appearing as a breaking wave, a tsunami may instead initially resemble a rapidly rising tide, and for this reason they are often referred to as tidal waves.  Tsunamis generally consist of a series of waves with periods ranging from minutes to hours, arriving in a so-called "wave train".  Wave heights of tens of metres can be generated by large events.  Although the impact of tsunamis is limited to coastal areas, their destructive power can be enormous and they can affect entire ocean basins; the 2004 Indian Ocean tsunami was among the deadliest natural disasters in human history with at least 290,000 people killed or missing in 14 countries bordering the Indian Ocean.

Summary of provisions
The bill authorizes the National Oceanic and Atmospheric Administration (NOAA) to continue through 2017 its on-going programs to forecast tsunamis. The bill would authorize NOAA to spend $27 million a year on this program over fiscal years 2015, 2016, and 2017.

Procedural history
The Tsunami Warning, Education, and Research Act of 2014 was introduced into the United States House of Representatives on July 31, 2014 by Rep. Suzanne Bonamici (D, OR-1). The bill was referred to the United States House Committee on Science, Space and Technology. On September 8, 2014, the House voted to pass the bill in a voice vote. The bill was received in the United States Senate on September 9, 2014 and referred to the United States Senate Committee on Commerce, Science, and Transportation.

Debate and discussion
Rep. Bonamici, who introduced the bill, said that "the coastlines of the United States already play an integral role in the economic prosperity of this country and we must strengthen their preparedness and resiliency so they can continue to play that role going forward." Bonamici also said that the bill "will improve the country's understanding of the threat posed by tsunami events" because it will "improve forecasting and notification systems, support local community outreach and preparedness and response plans, and develop supportive technologies."

Rep. Dana Rohrabacher (R-CA) also supported the bill, saying that, because of the devastating nature of tsunamis, "we must learn more about tsunami events, provide better and more accurate tsunami forecasting, and reduce impacts on at-risk communities."

See also
List of bills in the 113th United States Congress

References

External links

Library of Congress - Thomas H.R. 5309
beta.congress.gov H.R. 5309
GovTrack.us H.R. 5309
OpenCongress.org H.R. 5309
WashingtonWatch.com H.R. 5309
 Animation of DART tsunami detection system
 How to survive a tsunami – Guide for children and youth
 National Tsunami Hazard Mitigation Program Coordinated U.S. Federal/State effort
 NOAA Center for Tsunami Research (NCTR)
 NOAA Tsunami – General description of tsunamis and the United States agency NOAA's role

Proposed legislation of the 113th United States Congress
Risk management
Articles containing video clips